Mackenzie North is a former territorial electoral district, that elected Members to the Northwest Territories Legislative Assembly.

Mackenzie North covered the communities of Yellowknife, Bathurst Inlet, Fort Providence, Fort Rae, Snare River, Outpost Island, Hottah Lake, Port Radium, Coppermine, Matthews Lake, Giauque Lake and Gros Cap.

1954 election

1951 election

References

Former electoral districts of Northwest Territories